Khao Chi Chan Junction railway station is a railway station located in Bang Sare Subdistrict, Sattahip District, Chon Buri. The station opened in July 1989 as part of the Eastern Line Chachoengsao Junction–Sattahip Port section. It is the junction for the Ban Phlu Ta Luang Mainline and the Map Ta Phut Port Line.

Train services 
 Ordinary train No. 283/284 Bangkok–Ban Phlu Ta Luang–Bangkok

References 
 
 
 

Railway stations in Thailand
Railway stations opened in 1989
1989 establishments in Thailand